|}
Gary Royce Cartwright (born 20 February 1952) is a former Australian politician. He was the Labor member for Victoria River in the Northern Territory Legislative Assembly from 1990 to 1994.

References

1952 births
Living people
Members of the Northern Territory Legislative Assembly
Australian Labor Party members of the Northern Territory Legislative Assembly